Candaba Swamp is located in Candaba, Pampanga province, 60 km northeast of Manila in the Philippines. It encompasses about 32,000 ha, made of freshwater ponds, swamps and marshes surrounded by seasonally flooded grasslands. The entire area becomes submerged underwater during the wet season. It dries out during the months of November to April, then the swamp is converted to farmland by the locals. Watermelon and rice are usually planted, comprising the vegetation of the floodplain, together with patches of Nipa palm and some mangrove species.

The Candaba swamp also acts as a natural flood retention basin during the rainy season. It holds the overflow from five smaller rivers (Maasim, San Miguel, Garlang, Bulu and Peñaranda), then drains into the larger Pampanga River.

References 

 Dagumbay, Marna (18 Jun 2005). “Candaba swamp in Pampanga a bird-flu hotspot.” Sun Star Network Online. Accessed on Dec 2012.
 Municipality of Candaba (2007). “Candaba Swamp.” Candaba Official Site. Accessed on Dec 2012.
 Orejas, Tonette (17 Jan 2005). “Asian migratory birds back at Candaba Swamp.” INQ7.net. Accessed on Dec 2012.
 Orejas, Tonette (16 Jan 2006). “Rare Birds Sighted at Candaba Swamp.” BirdWatch.ph. Accessed on 27 Dec 2012.

Swamps of Asia
Wetlands of the Philippines
Landforms of Pampanga